Osa or OSA may refer to:

Places
 Osa Peninsula, a peninsula in Costa Rica
 Osa (canton), a canton in the province of Puntarenas in Costa Rica
 Osa Conservation Area, an administrative area in Costa Rica
 Osa, India, a village in Allahabad, India
 Osa, Iran, a village in Mazandaran Province, Iran
 Osa, Warmian-Masurian Voivodeship, north Poland
 Osa, Norway, a village in Ulvik municipality, Vestland county, Norway
 Osa, Russia, the name of several inhabited localities in Russia
 Osa, Missouri, a community in the United States
 Old Scona Academic High School, a school in Edmonton, Canada
 Oakland School for the Arts

Military
 Osa-class missile boat
 9K33 Osa (SA-8 Gecko), a Soviet surface-to-air missile launcher
 M79 Osa, a Serbian/Yugoslav rocket launcher
 Avia B.122 Osa, a Czech trainer aircraft
 Osa (handgun) a Russian non-lethal handgun

Science and technology
 Optical spectrum analyzer
 Osa (plant), a monotypic genus of plant in the family Rubiaceae

Medicine
 Obstructive sleep apnea, a sleep-related breathing disorder wherein episodes of upper airway obstruction lead to reduced breathing that interrupts normal sleep
 Osteosarcoma, a malignant neoplasm of bone

Computing
 Open Scripting Architecture, for AppleScript
 Open Services Access, a set of standards for mobile telecommunications
 Online Sexual Activity
 Open Systems Adapter, an IBM card for mainframes
 Open systems architecture, a telecommunication standard
 Oversampling

Organizations
 Oceania Swimming Association
 Ontario Soccer Association
 Ontario Society of Artists
 Open Solutions Alliance
 Optical Society
 Order of Saint Anne
 Order of Saint Augustine (Ordo Sancti Augustini), the Roman Catholic Augustinian order
 Oregon Student Association
 Organization of the Secret Army, French far-right nationalist group in Algeria
 OSA, a Czech Republic performance rights organisation
 Oriental Society of Australia now the Australian Society for Asian Humanities
 OSA Group, a Constructivist architectural association of the 1920s based in the USSR
 Orissa Society of the Americas, a non-profit organization that promotes understanding of Oriya culture and history
 Intelligence-Security Agency of Bosnia and Herzegovina (Obavještajno sigurnosna / bezbjednosna agencija, or OSA-OBA), an intelligence and security agency of Bosnia and Herzegovina
 Office of the Science Advisor, of the United States Environmental Protection Agency
 Office of Special Affairs, a controversial department of the Church of Scientology
 Operation Save America
 Oscilloquartz SA

People
Sumire Haruno, Japanese actress, nicknamed Osa
Lars Osa (1860–1958), Norwegian artist
Osa Odighizuwa (born 1998), American football player
Osa Maliki (1907–1969), Indonesian politician

Other uses
 Old Stone Age or Paleolithic
 Office of Secret Actions, a fictional government department in the video game Return to Castle Wolfenstein
 Official Secrets Act
 Online savings account
 Open skies agreement
 Osaka International Airport (former IATA code: OSA)

See also
 Ossa (disambiguation)